Adam Beach (born November 11, 1972) is a Canadian actor. He is best known for his roles as Victor Joseph in Smoke Signals, Frank Fencepost in Dance Me Outside, Tommy on Walker, Texas Ranger, Kickin' Wing in Joe Dirt, U.S. Marine Corporal Ira Hayes in Flags of Our Fathers, Private Ben Yahzee in Windtalkers, Dr. Charles Eastman (Ohiyesa) in Bury My Heart at Wounded Knee, NYPD Detective Chester Lake in Law & Order: Special Victims Unit, and Officer Jim Chee in the film adaptations of Skinwalkers, Coyote Waits, and A Thief of Time. He starred in the Canadian 2012-2014 series Arctic Air, and played Slipknot in the 2016 film Suicide Squad. He also performed as Squanto in Disney's historical drama film Squanto: A Warrior's Tale. Most recently he has starred in Hostiles (2017) as Black Hawk, and the Netflix original film Juanita (2019) as Jess Gardiner, and Edward Nappo in Jane Campion's The Power of the Dog.

Early life
Adam Beach was born in Ashern, Manitoba. He is Saulteaux Anishinaabe and has some Icelandic roots through his great-grandmother. Beach spent his early years with his parents and two brothers on the Lake Manitoba/Dog Creek First Nation Reserve at Lake Manitoba. When Beach was eight years old, his mother, Sally Beach, eight months pregnant with a baby girl, was killed by a drunk driver. Eight weeks after his mother's death, the family discovered their father Dennis Beach had drowned near the community. It is unclear whether his death was an accident or suicide.

Adam and his two brothers initially lived with their grandmother; he was with her from age 8 to 12. Five years after their parents' deaths, the three brothers were taken to Winnipeg to live with an aunt and paternal uncle: Agnes and Chris Beach (his father's brother). Adam refers to his Uncle Chris as "Dad".

Beach attended a drama class at Gordon Bell High School. He began performing in local theatre productions, and eventually dropped out of school to take a lead role at the Manitoba Theatre for Young People.

Career
Beach has a long list of diverse portrayals. He saw acting as a catharsis and turned to theater as a venue to express his feelings and tell his own personal stories. At age 18, Beach won a small role in the miniseries Lost in the Barrens, based on the Farley Mowat novel. In the following years, he continued to work in local theatre and guest-starred on television shows such as Walker, Texas Ranger and Touched by an Angel. Shortly afterwards, Beach was cast as a regular on the television shows North of 60 and The Rez. After his performance in Dance Me Outside, he starred in Smoke Signals, which was nominated for the Grand Jury Prize at the Sundance FILMS Festival. He took a small role in Disney's Mystery, Alaska in 1999 and in 2000 accepted a role in the thriller, The Last Stop. Beach appeared in Helen Lee's The Art of Woo and the 2001 hit Joe Dirt as Kickin' Wing, a Native American fireworks salesman. The producers of Joe Dirt had originally wanted to hire Evan Adams for the parody of his character in Smoke Signals, but accidentally called Beach instead.

In 2002, Windtalkers, starring Beach, was released in theatres; it was about Navajo codetalkers working with the US Marines during World War II. To prepare for this role, Beach spent six months learning the Navajo language. He used this language in his next project, Skinwalkers, based on a novel by Tony Hillerman and directed by Chris Eyre, who had given him his breakout role in Smoke Signals. Between large-scale projects, Beach made small television appearances on such shows as JAG and Third Watch. Also, in 2003, he returned to the character that he first portrayed in Skinwalkers in the movie Coyote Waits, also based on a Hillerman novel. He also made a guest appearance in the hit show The Dead Zone as a Native shaman (in the episode "Shaman").

In 2006, Beach portrayed Ira Hayes in Clint Eastwood's feature film Flags of Our Fathers. During the filming of this movie, both Beach's grandmother and his best friend died. Beach commented, "And if you add those up, there's a lot of emotion. When you're doing a movie, when you let go emotionally, there's nothing to grab onto," he said about the deaths. About playing the part, Beach said, "For me, playing Ira was a meaningful relationship. I would call it – trying to find out how he was, or how he thought and felt". The movie won two Academy Award nominations and Beach was nominated for multiple Best Supporting Actor honors.

In 2006, Beach ran as a candidate to lead his Lake Manitoba First Nation; he was not successful but said he will try again. In 2007, Beach starred in HBO Films' adaptation of Dee Brown's history, Bury My Heart at Wounded Knee. In the film, Beach portrays Charles Eastman (Dakota name Ohiyesa), a doctor, Sioux advocate, and author. He explores and expresses the changing understanding of Aboriginal-US relations during the period leading up to the Wounded Knee Massacre.

In addition to starring in the Canadian television series Moose TV, Beach is executive-producing and starring in the movie Older Than America. The independent feature is filmed in Cloquet, Minnesota, mostly on the Fond du Lac Ojibwe reservation. He joined the cast of Law & Order: Special Victims Unit as Detective Chester Lake for the show's ninth season after guest-starring in season eight. In April 2008, TV Guide announced that he would not return for the show's tenth season. He later stated he grew disillusioned with the strictly procedural nature of the show and opted to leave after the finish of the ninth season.

Starting in 2009, Beach played a supporting role on the HBO series Big Love as a manager in an Indian casino with Bill Henrickson (Bill Paxton). On February 10, 2010, it was announced that Beach will portray Tommy Prince, the Canadian war hero, in an upcoming movie about his life. According to Bay Film Studios, the movie will be a "true account of Canada's most highly decorated First Nations soldier." Beach said he is honoured to portray Prince, calling him a positive role model for all First Nations. In 2011, he starred in Cowboys & Aliens, an American science fiction Western film directed by Jon Favreau and starring Daniel Craig, Harrison Ford, and Olivia Wilde. The film is based on the 2006 graphic novel of the same name created by Scott Mitchell Rosenberg. Also in 2011, Beach returned to Canada to star in the TV series Arctic Air, which premiered on January 12, 2012. In 2015, Beach appeared on several episodes of Backstrom as Sheriff Jesse Rocha. In 2017, he played Black Hawk in Hostiles, starring Christian Bale, Rosamund Pike, and Wes Studi.

Beach selected as the host for the new Canadian competition show A Cut Above.  It will air starting on August 8 on Discovery Channel.

Personal life

Adam Beach has been married three times and has three children. He has two sons with his first wife, Meredith Porter (married 1999–2002). He did not have children with his second wife, Tara Mason (married 2003⁠–⁠2007). In 2008, his current wife, Summer Tiger, gave birth to a daughter.

Awards and nominations

Filmography

Films

Television

See also
Notable Aboriginal people of Canada

References

External links

Profile at Native Networks
Time.com Q&A
The Hour interview – Video

1972 births
20th-century Canadian male actors
21st-century Canadian male actors
Canadian male film actors
Canadian male television actors
Canadian male voice actors
Canadian people of Icelandic descent
First Nations male actors
Indspire Awards
Living people
Male actors from Manitoba
Members of the United Church of Canada 
People from Interlake Region, Manitoba
Saulteaux people